The Colyaer Freedom S100 is a Spanish amphibious ultralight and light-sport aircraft, designed and produced by Colyaer of Portonovo.

Design and development
The Freedom was subject to a lengthy eleven-year development process between 1995 and 2006. It was designed to comply with the Fédération Aéronautique Internationale microlight rules  and US light-sport aircraft rules. It features a cantilever high-wing, a two-seats-in-side-by-side configuration enclosed cockpit, retractable tricycle landing gear, wing-tip pontoons and a single engine in pusher configuration.

The Freedom is made entirely from carbon fibre, Kevlar and fibreglass composites. The long wingspan gives the Freedom a glide ratio of 20:1 and allows power-off soaring flights. The standard engine is the  Rotax 912ULS four-stroke powerplant.

In 2015 the aircraft was marketed by Galicia Avionica SL.

Specifications (Freedom S100)

References

External links

2000s Spanish ultralight aircraft
Homebuilt aircraft
Light-sport aircraft
Single-engined pusher aircraft